Holy Cross Cemetery & Mausoleum, located at 7301 West Nash Street in Milwaukee, Wisconsin, is a Roman Catholic cemetery operated by the Archdiocese of Milwaukee. Established in 1909, the cemetery comprises 196 acres, with about 135,000 burials in graves and about 15,000 in crypts and niches.

Notable burials
 James B. Brennan (1926–2021) – United States Attorney for the Eastern District of Wisconsin
 Raymond Joseph Cannon (1894–1951) – U.S. Representative
 Joseph Aloysius "Red" Dunn (1901–1957) – American football player
 William Sylvester Harley (1880–1943) – Co-founder of the Harley-Davidson Motor Company
 Charles Joseph Kersten (1902–1972) – U.S. Representative
 Patrick Joseph Lucey (1918–2014) – Governor of Wisconsin from 1971 to 1977.
 John Dann MacDonald (1916–1986) – Writer of novels
 Henry C. "Hank" Raymonds (1924–2010) – Basketball coach

References

External links 
Holy Cross Cemetery & Mausoleum at FindAGrave
Archdiocese of Milwaukee Catholic Cemeteries

Cemeteries in Wisconsin
Geography of Milwaukee
Roman Catholic Archdiocese of Milwaukee
Roman Catholic cemeteries in Wisconsin
1909 establishments in Wisconsin